Veckans nyheter is a Swedish satirical news and sketch comedy television program that aired on Kanal 5 for two seasons in 2006. Henrik Schyffert hosted the first season, with André Wickström taking over for season two.

External links
Kanal 5 - Veckans nyheter

Kanal 5 (Swedish TV channel) original programming
2000s satirical television series
2006 Swedish television series debuts
Swedish comedy television series